UFC 78: Validation was a mixed martial arts event held by the Ultimate Fighting Championship (UFC), that took place on November 17, 2007, at the Prudential Center in Newark, New Jersey. Validation was the first UFC event held in New Jersey since UFC 53: Heavy Hitters in Atlantic City on June 5, 2005.

Background
This was the 100th event in UFC's history.

The main event featured TUF 2 Heavyweight winner Rashad Evans against TUF 3 Light Heavyweight winner Michael Bisping in a light heavyweight contest. This was Bisping's last fight before dropping to Middleweight. Originally, Evans and Bisping were set to rematch their previous opponents Tito Ortiz and Matt Hamill at this event after their bouts ended in a draw and a controversial split decision at UFC 73 and UFC 75. However, Ortiz's commitments to filming Celebrity Apprentice forced his fight with Evans to be cancelled and an injury to Hamill forced him to withdraw from his fight with Bisping.

PRIDE veteran and Cuban judoka Hector Lombard was also scheduled to debut on the event but did not participate due to visa issues. Lombard ended up signing after UFC 145. Lombard's original opponent Karo Parisyan instead faced Ryo Chonan, while Chonan's previous opponent Thiago Alves fought Chris Lytle.

Additionally, PRIDE veterans Ryo Chonan and Akihiro Gono both made their UFC debuts. Both fighters fought at 183 pounds in Japan, but with the UFC's inclusion of the 170 pound division each fighter moved down to fight at welterweight.

Results

Bonus awards
At the end of this event, $55,000 was awarded to each of the fighters who received one of these three awards.

Fight of the Night: Thiago Alves vs. Chris Lytle
Knockout of the Night: Ed Herman
Submission of the Night: Akihiro Gono

See also
 Ultimate Fighting Championship
 List of UFC champions
 List of UFC events
 2007 in UFC

References

External links
 UFC 78 fight card
 UFC 78 results at Sherdog.com
 Official UFC 78 website

Ultimate Fighting Championship events
2007 in mixed martial arts
Mixed martial arts in New Jersey
Sports competitions in Newark, New Jersey
2007 in sports in New Jersey